Spirama euphrages is a species of moth of the family Erebidae. It is found in Indonesia (Irian Jaya).

References

Moths described in 1924
Spirama
Moths of Indonesia